Judi Werthein (born 1967) is an Argentinian artist.

Early life and education
Werthein was born in Buenos Aires in 1967. In 1993, she received a Masters of Architecture from the University of Buenos Aires.

Career
In 2007 she exhibited at Art in General, in New York City. In 2011, her film Do you Have Time?  was presented at the Aldrich Contemporary Art Museum.

Her work is included in the collection of the Tate Museum, London and the Guggenheim Museum.

References

Artists from Buenos Aires
20th-century Argentine women artists
21st-century Argentine women artists
1967 births
Living people